The Indonesian Broadcasting Commission (abbreviated as KPI) is an independent broadcasting agency in Indonesia that functions as a regulating body for broadcasting companies in the country. The commission was established in 2002 based on Act No. 32 of 2002 on Broadcasting. KPI consists of the Central Indonesian Broadcasting Commission (KPI Pusat) and the Regional Indonesian Broadcasting Commission (KPID) who work on the provincial level.

Formation 
The predecessor of today's KPI was the National Broadcasting Advisory and Controlling Agency (Badan Pertimbangan dan Pengendalian Penyiaran Nasional, or BP3N), mandated upon the provision of Act No. 24 of 1997 on Broadcasting, but it did not came into formation.

The succeeding Act No. 32 of 2002 on Broadcasting is the main basis for the establishment of the KPI. The broadcasting system is managed by an independent body free from any influence of the financiers, powerful people and political institutions such as the government. In comparison, Section 7 of the former Act No. 24 of 1997 on Broadcasting states that  "broadcasting is dominated by the country's structure and operations are undertaken by the government", indicating that the broadcasting agency was subject to the government of Indonesia.

Indonesia's democratization process puts the public as both owner and controller of the broadcasting sphere industry. This is because the frequencies are public property and limited in nature; their use should be for the greater public interest. This means that the media broadcasting services must perform the function of provision of information for public health. The information is varied, ranging from news, entertainment, science, etc. The healthy function of information services, as set out in Act No. 32 of 2002, is based on the principles of diversity of ownership and diversity of content.

Notable cases
In September 2014, five cartoons, namely Tom and Jerry, SpongeBob SquarePants, Crayon Shinchan,  and Bima Sakti (Indonesian name of Chhota Bheem) which air on RCTI, Global TV (now GTV), and ANTV, were reprimanded by KPI after being considered to contain violence, pornography and material unsuitable for children.
In December 2018, a Shopee ad featuring South Korean girlband Blackpink was prohibited by KPI for the members wearing little clothing.
In September 2019, Rabbids Invasion segments of the "SpongeBob SquarePants" show airing on GTV were reprimanded by KPI for containing violent scenes. However, this caused public outcry and was somewhat inaccurate.
In late January 2021, KPI imposed sanctions on ANTV after airing foreign shows exceeding the limit of 40% in a day.

Controversy 
In September 2021, one of KPI employees filed a criminal case regarding sexual abuse he had received, which lasted from 2012.

Awards
The KPI organize Indonesian Broadcasting Commission Awards (Anugerah KPI), which is held every year since 2006.

References 

Government agencies of Indonesia
2002 establishments in Indonesia
Government agencies established in 2002
Mass media complaints authorities
Broadcasting authorities
Broadcasting in Indonesia